

Champions

Major League Baseball
1974 World Series: Oakland Athletics over Los Angeles Dodgers (4-1); Rollie Fingers, MVP

All-Star Game, July 23 at Three Rivers Stadium: National League, 7-2; Steve Garvey, MVP

Other champions
College World Series: USC
Japan Series: Lotte Orions over Chunichi Dragons (4-1)
Big League World Series: Taipei, Taiwan
Little League World Series: Kaohsiung, Taiwan
Senior League World Series: Pingtung, Taiwan
Winter Leagues
1974 Caribbean Series: Criollos de Caguas
Dominican Republic League: Tigres del Licey
Mexican Pacific League: Venados de Mazatlán
Puerto Rican League: Criollos de Caguas
Venezuelan League: *
 * The season was canceled due to a player's strike and the Mexican Pacific League's second place, Yaquis de Obregón, played as a replacement in the Caribbean Series.

Awards and honors
Baseball Hall of Fame
Cool Papa Bell
Jim Bottomley
Jocko Conlan
Whitey Ford
Mickey Mantle
Sam Thompson
Most Valuable Player
Jeff Burroughs (AL) Texas Rangers
Steve Garvey (NL) Los Angeles Dodgers
Cy Young Award
Catfish Hunter (AL) Oakland Athletics
Mike Marshall (NL) Los Angeles Dodgers
Rookie of the Year
Mike Hargrove (AL) Texas Rangers
Bake McBride (NL) St. Louis Cardinals
Gold Glove Award
George Scott (1B) (AL) 
Bobby Grich (2B) (AL) 
Brooks Robinson (3B) (AL) 
Mark Belanger (SS) (AL) 
Paul Blair (OF) (AL) 
Amos Otis (OF) (AL) 
Joe Rudi (OF) (AL)
Thurman Munson (C) (AL) 
Jim Kaat (P) (AL)

MLB statistical leaders

Major league baseball final standings

American League final standings

National League final standings

Events

January–March
January 9 – The St. Louis Cardinals purchase the contract of outfielder Jay Johnstone from the Oakland Athletics 
January 16 – The Baseball Writers' Association of America elects former New York Yankees teammates Mickey Mantle and Whitey Ford to the Hall of Fame. Mantle becomes only the seventh player to make it in his first try.
February 11 – Dick Woodson becomes the first player to invoke the new free agency clause, seeking a $30,000 salary while the Minnesota Twins offer $23,000. The arbitrator sides with Woodson. On May 4, the Twins trade Woodson to the New York Yankees for Mike Pazik and cash.
February 13 – Cool Papa Bell is named for Hall of Fame honors by the Special Committee on the Negro Leagues.
February 23 – The California Angels send veteran Vada Pinson to Kansas City for a minor leaguer and cash consideration. Pinson will call it quits at the end of the 1975 season, having rung up 2,757 hits.
March 19 – The Detroit Tigers, New York Yankees and Cleveland Indians are part of a three team trade. The Yankees send outfielder Jerry Moses to Detroit for pitcher Ed Farmer. The Tigers then sent pitcher Jim Perry to Cleveland. The Indians then sent outfielder Walt Williams and pitcher Rick Sawyer to the Yankees. 
March 26 – The Boston Red Sox release future Hall of Fame shortstop Luis Aparicio, who retires, and designated hitter Orlando Cepeda, who will sign with the Kansas City Royals.

April
April 1 – The Chicago Cubs release pitcher and three time All-Star Milt Pappas. Pappas never again pitches in the major leagues.  
April 3 – The Cleveland Indians trade Pedro Guerrero to the Los Angeles Dodgers for pitcher Bruce Ellingsen The 17-year-old infielder-outfielder will compile a .309 lifetime batting average and will be named to the all-star team five times during his 11 seasons with the team.
April 4 – Hank Aaron hits the 714th home run of his career, tying Babe Ruth's lifetime home run record.
April 6 – The New York Yankees defeat the Cleveland Indians 6-1 in their "home opener" at Shea Stadium. The Yankees will share this ballpark with the Mets for the 1974 and  seasons, while Yankee Stadium is being re-furbished.
April 8 – Hank Aaron hits home run number 715, finally breaking Babe Ruth's lifetime home run record. Two fans run onto the field and congratulate him on the record breaking achievement as Hank moves past second base.
April 10 – The 1973 National League pennant is raised before the home opener in which The New York Mets defeat the St. Louis Cardinals, 3–2 in front of only 17,154 fans at Shea Stadium. Jerry Grote of the Mets homered in that game.
April 14 – Graig Nettles of the New York Yankees hits four home runs during a doubleheader split against his former team, the Cleveland Indians. The Yankees win 9–5, then lose 6–9. Nettles will go on to tie a major league record with 11 home runs in the month of April.
April 17 – The Chicago Cubs new catcher George Mitterwald hit three home runs and drove in eight runs as the Cubs slaughter The Pittsburgh Pirates 16–9. As an added oddity, Burt Hooton went the distance for the Cubs despite giving up 16 hits.
April 18 - Montreal Expos' Jim Cox hit a 3-run home run off New York Mets' Ray Sadecki in the 3rd inning, part of the Expos' 8-5 win over the fading Mets who lost 5 in a row. The Mets would fail to defend their 1973 National League pennant enroute to their first losing season since 1968.
April 24 – All twenty-one hits by both teams in the Chicago White Sox 7-2 victory over the Milwaukee Brewers are singles.
April 26:
The record breaking is not over for Hank Aaron. Today he hits his 15th career grand slam home run, passing Gil Hodges and Willie McCovey for the NL mark. The Braves go on to beat the Cubs, 9-3.
The New York Yankees trade pitcher Fritz Peterson, who had earlier attracted unwelcomed attention to the team when he announced that he and a teammate had swapped wives and families, along with pitchers  Fred Beene, Tom Buskey, and Steve Kline to the Cleveland Indians for pitchers Cecil Upshaw and Dick Tidrow and First Baseman Chris Chambliss. Chambliss would go on to be part of Yankees lore when his home run against Kansas City in 1976 helped the Yankees capture their first pennant since 1964. 
April 30 – At Fenway Park, Nolan Ryan of the Angels strikes out 19 Red Sox batters in a 4-2 victory. In a frightening moment, he hits second baseman Doug Griffin in the head with a fastball. Griffin will be sidelined for two months.

May-June
May 1 – Dock Ellis of the Pittsburgh Pirates hits three consecutive batters with pitches in the first inning, setting an ML record, and walks another in the frame before being lifted. Pittsburgh loses 5–3 to the Cincinnati Reds.
May 4 – Boston Red Sox shortstop Rick Burleson ties a major league record by committing three errors in his major league debut.
May 22 – The New York Mets purchase the contract of catcher Alex Trevino from Cuidad Victoria from the Mexican Center Baseball League. 
May 30 – Sadaharu Oh becomes the first player in Nippon Professional Baseball to hit 600 home runs. Only Babe Ruth, Hank Aaron and Willie Mays are ahead of Oh among U.S. players at this time, but he will surpass them all.
June 4 – The Cleveland Indians attempt an ill-advised ten cent beer promotion for a game against the Texas Rangers at Cleveland Municipal Stadium. Cleveland forfeits 9-0 after alcohol-fueled mayhem and violence spreads from the stands onto the field.
June 5 – Hank Aaron hits his 16th career grand slam homer as the Braves top the Phillies, 7-3, in Philadelphia.
June 10 – The Philadelphia Phillies Mike Schmidt hits the ball off the speaker at the Houston Astrodome, turning a sure homer into one of the longest singles hit in a 12-0 Phillies victory over the Houston Astros.
June 11 – Mel Stottlemyre of the New York Yankees makes his 272nd consecutive start, with no relief appearances, to set an American League record.
June 14 – California Angels pitcher Nolan Ryan pitches 13 innings, and strikes out 19 batters, including Red Sox first baseman Cecil Cooper, who alone struck out six straight times. The Angels defeated Boston 4-3 in 15 innings. 
June 19 – George Scott, who walks to lead off the second inning, is the Brewers' only base runner as Steve Busby of the Kansas City Royals hurls a 2–0 no-hitter. Busby is the first major league pitcher to throw no-hitters in his first two seasons.
June 21 – The Braves fire manager Eddie Mathews, the only man to have played for the Braves in Boston, Milwaukee and Atlanta.
June 24 – Steve Busby of the Kansas City Royals retires the first nine batters he faces to set an American League record with 33 consecutive batsmen retired. The Royals lose, however, 3–1 to the Chicago White Sox.

July–September
July 11 – The San Diego Padres release outfielder Matty Alou. Alou's brother Felipe was released by the Milwaukee Brewers on April 29. Younger brother Jesús keeps the Alou name alive in the majors, playing for the Oakland Athletics.
July 14 – In a doubleheader with the Brewers, the Rangers' Billy Martin is the first American League manager to be removed by umpires from two games in one day.
July 17:
Bob Gibson of the St. Louis Cardinals strikes out César Gerónimo of the Cincinnati Reds to become the second pitcher to strike out 3,000 batters in the majors. Gerónimo will become Nolan Ryan's 3,000th strikeout victim six years later.
Milwaukee third baseman Don Money commits a first-inning error in a 10–5 loss to Minnesota, ending his perfect defensive season after 86 games and 257 chances. He will end the season with just five errors, breaking George Kell's record set in 1950. Money also holds the National League record with just 10 errors, set with the Phillies in 1972, and holds both the National League and American League records for most consecutive chances without an error in a season.
Los Angeles Dodgers pitcher Tommy John, who started the season 13–3, has his season come to an abrupt end when he tears a ligament in his pitching elbow in the Dodgers 5–4 loss to the Montreal Expos.
July 19 – Dick Bosman of the Cleveland Indians no-hits the Oakland Athletics 4–0. Bosman has no one but himself to blame for not picking up a rare perfect game. His throwing error in the fourth inning puts the only A's runner (Sal Bando) on base. The two clubs combine to set an American League record with two runners left on base.
July 23 – The National League triumphs in the All-Star Game at Pittsburgh, winning 7–2 over the American League. Steve Garvey is named the MVP.
July 25 – Carl Yastrzemski hits his 300th career home run helping the Boston Red Sox beat the Detroit Tigers 12–4.
August 6 – Johnny Bench hits his 200th career home run helping the Cincinnati Reds beat the Los Angeles Dodgers 6–3.
August 7 – The Detroit Tigers release first baseman Norm Cash. Cash had been the Tigers regular first baseman since 1960.
August 12 – Nolan Ryan of the California Angels strikes out 19 in a 4–2 victory over the Boston Red Sox.
August 20 – Davey Lopes sets a Dodgers record when he totals 15 bases against the Cubs in an 18–8 drubbing at Wrigley Field. Lopes has three home runs, a double and a single in his team's 24-hit attack. The Dodgers totaled 48 bases in the game, a team record.
August 27 – Hal McRae of the Kansas City Royals ties a Major League record with six extra base hits (five doubles and a home run).
September 1 – The St. Louis cardinals sell the contact of catcher Tim McCarver to the Boston Red Sox. 
September 3 – In an amazing performance, SF Giants' John Montefusco makes his major league debut, hits a home run in his first official time at bat off Charlie Hough, and pitches nine innings of relief to earn a 9–5 victory over the Dodgers.
September 4 – Pitcher Don Wilson has a no-hitter through eight innings, but is pulled from the game by Houston Astros manager Preston Gómez. Reliever Mike Cosgrove gives up a leadoff single to Tony Pérez, and the Astros lose to the Cincinnati Reds, 2–1. Gomez made the same mistake in San Diego on July 21, 1970. Clay Kirby had a no-hitter going for eight innings, but with two outs in the 8th and trailing 1–0, Gomez lifted him for pinch hitter Cito Gaston. Gaston failed to get a hit, and reliever Jack Baldschun gave up two runs in the 9th. The Padres lost 3–0.
September 7 – During a 3–1 win over the Chicago White Sox, Nolan Ryan of the California Angels has a fastball clocked at 100.8 miles per hour (161.28 kilometres per hours) — the fastest pitch recorded.
September 8 – Pat Pieper ends 59-year career as public address announcer for the Chicago Cubs.
September 10 – Cardinal Lou Brock breaks Maury Wills' major league record by stealing his 104th and 105th bases of the season. It also gives him 740 career stolen bases, breaking Max Carey's National League record of 738.
September 11 – The St. Louis Cardinals win a marathon night game against the New York Mets at Shea Stadium, after seven hours four minutes, and 25 innings, the longest game to a decision in major league history. The Cardinals, trailing 3-1 with two out in the ninth, tie the score on Ken Reitz' two-run home run off Jerry Koosman, sending the game into extra innings. Two Mets errors lead to the Cardinals' winning run, starting with an errant pickoff throw that allows Bake McBride to scamper all the way around from first. St. Louis wins, 4–3. The Mets go to the plate 103 times, the only time the century mark has been reached in a major league game; the Cards are not far behind with 99 plate appearances. All told, a record 175 official at-bats are recorded, with a major-league record 45 runners stranded. Only a thousand fans are on hand when the game ends at 3:13 a.m.
September 12 – Tigers pitcher John Hiller picks up his 17th victory in relief, an American League record, as he beats the Brewers, 9–7.
September 24:
Al Kaline of the Detroit Tigers doubles off Dave McNally for his 3,000th career hit, as the Tigers lose to the Orioles 5–4.
Clarence Jones of the Kintetsu Buffaloes hits his 38th home run to become the first foreign player to win a home run title in Nippon Professional Baseball, topping the Pacific League. Sadaharu Oh will lead the Central League with 49 homers. Jones will lead the Pacific League again with 36 HR in 1976.
September 25 – Dodgers pitcher Tommy John undergoes surgery to repair the ulnar collateral ligament in his pitching elbow. The surgery, performed by Frank Jobe is now named after the pitcher.
September 28:
In his last start of the year, Nolan Ryan of the California Angels pitches his third career no-hitter, victimizing the Minnesota Twins, 4–0. In the process, Ryan strikes out 15 batters for the sixth time this season. He also walks eight to run his season total to 202 bases on balls, joining Bob Feller in 1938 as the only pitcher to walk more than 200 in a season. Ryan will set a personal high issuing 204 walks in 1977.
Don Wilson of the Houston Astros throws a 5–0, two-hit shutout against the Braves. It would be Wilson's last major league game, followed barely three months later by his accidental death.

October–December
October 1
The Los Angeles clinched their National League West championship after hearing that the Atlanta Braves beat the Cincinnati Reds 7-1. Putting the Reds out of the postseason
The Baltimore Orioles are back in the postseason after a subpar 1972 season as they clinch the American League East after beating the Detroit Tigers 7-6 and then the Milwaukee Brewers ended the Yankees' Cinderella season with a 3-2 win. 
October 3 – Frank Robinson becomes the first black manager in major league history, as the Cleveland Indians name him to replace Ken Aspromonte for the 1975 season.
October 17 – At the Oakland Coliseum, the Oakland Athletics win the World Series over the Los Angeles Dodgers in Game Five, clinching a third straight World Championship. Reliever Rollie Fingers is named the Series MVP.
October 22 – The New York Yankees trade outfielder Bobby Murcer to the San Francisco Giants for outfielder Bobby Bonds.
October 23 – Wally Yonamine, an American of Japanese descent, becomes the only non-Japanese manager to win the Japan Series when his Chunichi Dragons beat the Lotte Orions.
November 2 – The Atlanta Braves trade Hank Aaron to the Milwaukee Brewers for outfielder Dave May and a minor league pitcher. Aaron will finish his major league career in Milwaukee, where he started it in 1954. Meanwhile, Aaron, the home run king of American baseball, and Sadaharu Oh, his Japanese counterpart, square off for a home run contest at Korakuen Stadium. Aaron wins 10–9.
November 20 – Texas Rangers right fielder Jeff Burroughs, who batted .301 with 25 home runs and a league-leading 118 RBI, wins the American League MVP Award. Oakland teammates Joe Rudi, Sal Bando and Reggie Jackson are the runners-up.
November 25 – Texas Rangers first baseman Mike Hargrove, who hit .323  with 66 RBI and a .395 OBP, is voted American League Rookie of the Year with 16 of 23 first place votes, with the others going to Bucky Dent (3), George Brett (2), Rick Burleson (1) and Jim Sundberg (1).
November 27:
St. Louis Cardinals CF Bake McBride, who hit .309 with six home runs and 56 RBI, wins the National League Rookie of the Year Award over Houston Astros RF Greg Gross (.314, 21 2B, 36 RBI) and Chicago Cubs 3B Bill Madlock (.313, 9 HR, 54 RBI).
Commissioner Bowie Kuhn suspends New York Yankees owner George Steinbrenner for two years as a result of Steinbrenner's conviction for illegal campaign contributions to Richard Nixon and other politicians.
December 2 – The Boston Red Sox trade speedy outfielder Tommy Harper to the California Angels for infielder Bob Heise.
December 3 – The New York Mets trade ace reliever and Shea Stadium favorite Tug McGraw to the Philadelphia Phillies along with Don Hahn and Dave Schneck. New York receives outfielder Del Unser,  pitcher Mac Scarce and catcher John Stearns, whom the Phillies had drafted #2 overall in the 1973 Major League Baseball draft.
December 26 – The Little League is officially opened to girls as President Gerald Ford signs legislation amending the charter of the organization. Little League had sought changes in their charter after a series of lawsuits challenged its boys-only rule.
December 31 – After earning his freedom through arbitration over missed insurance payments by the Oakland Athletics, Jim "Catfish" Hunter is signed to a $3.75 million contract which is slightly more than triple the next highest salary in the game.

Births

January
January 1 – Kevin Beirne
January 5 – Damon Minor
January 5 – Ryan Minor
January 5 – Mark Redman
January 6 – Marlon Anderson
January 7 – Rob Radlosky
January 11 – Cody McKay
January 11 – Warren Morris
January 14 – Mike Frank
January 15 – Ray King
January 19 – Amaury Telemaco
January 23 – Erubiel Durazo
January 23 – Mark Watson
January 25 – Dan Serafini
January 27 – Bryant Nelson
January 28 – Jermaine Dye
January 28 – Oscar Henríquez
January 28 – Magglio Ordóñez

February
February 7 – Adrian Brown
February 11 – Trey Beamon
February 13 – Howie Clark
February 15 – Ugueth Urbina
February 16 – Luis Figueroa
February 18 – Jamey Carroll
February 19 – Juan Díaz
February 20 – Tom Fordham
February 24 – Mike Lowell
February 25 – Shannon Stewart
February 27 – Cliff Politte

March
March 2 – Anthony Sanders
March 4 – Tommy Phelps
March 6 – Gabe Alvarez
March 6 – James Lofton
March 8 – Mike Moriarty
March 9 – Adán Amezcua
March 9 – Wayne Franklin
March 9 – Francisco Santos
March 9 – Brodie Van Wagenen
March 11 – Bobby Abreu
March 12 – Craig Dingman
March 15 – Robert Fick
March 19 – Rocky Coppinger
March 19 – Jason LaRue
March 22 – Jason Phillips
March 24 – Jamie Arnoldd
March 24 – Jim Rushford
March 28 – Ryan Christenson

April
April 3 – Jim Pittsley
April 6 – Danny Clyburn
April 8 – Eddie Priest
April 11 – Trot Nixon
April 15 – Reynaldo Garcia
April 19 – José Cruz Jr.
April 21 – Cliff Brumbaugh
April 24 – Will Cunnane
April 27 – Frank Catalanotto
April 27 – Steve Connelly
April 29 – Héctor Mercado
April 29 – Tony Saunders

May
May 1 – Stephen Randolph
May 4 – Miguel Cairo
May 10 – Bob Smith
May 13 – Shigeki Noguchi
May 14 – Jim Crowell
May 15 – A. J. Hinch
May 16 – Jerrod Riggan
May 17 – Wiki González
May 18 – Nelson Figueroa
May 18 – Félix Martínez Mata
May 20 – Brian McNichol
May 21 – Mark Quinn
May 22 – John Bale
May 24 – Masahide Kobayashi
May 25 – Miguel Tejada

June
June 4 – Trace Coquillette
June 4 – Darin Erstad
June 5 – Russ Ortiz
June 7 – Chris Richard
June 9 – Scarborough Green
June 9 – Randy Winn
June 12 – Damon Hollins
June 12 – Hideki Matsui
June 13 – Brian Sweeney
June 15 – Chris Wakeland
June 18 – Carlos Méndez
June 19 – Doug Mientkiewicz
June 21 – Sean Runyan
June 23 – Mark Hendrickson
June 24 – Chris Guccione
June 26 – Derek Jeter
June 26 – Jason Kendall
June 27 – Andy Larkin

July
July 2 – Sean Casey
July 4 – Jeff Harris
July 8 – Danny Ardoin
July 9 – Tom Evans
July 16 – Jonathan Johnson
July 19 – Preston Wilson
July 20 – Bengie Molina
July 21 – Brett Hinchliffe
July 21 – Geoff Jenkins
July 23 – Larry Barnes
July 27 – Brian Sikorski

August
August 1 – Justin Baughman
August 2 – Matt Miller
August 6 – Chris Heintz
August 6 – Luis Vizcaíno
August 9 – Matt Morris
August 12 – Matt Clement
August 12 – Shane Monahan
August 13 – Scott MacRae
August 13 – Jarrod Washburn
August 15 – Ramón Morel
August 16 – Roger Cedeño
August 16 – John Snyder
August 17 – Jeff Liefer
August 18 – Jayson Durocher
August 18 – Chris Stowers
August 19 – Brian Cooper
August 23 – Mark Bellhorn
August 23 – Bobby Estalella
August 23 – Alejandro Freire
August 24 – Bartolomé Fortunato
August 24 – Jeff Kubenka
August 25 – Gary Matthews Jr.
August 25 – Pablo Ozuna
August 27 – José Vidro
August 30 – Kris Foster

September
September 5 – Calvin Maduro
September 14 – Chad Bradford
September 21 – Manuel Barrios
September 23 – Eric Knott
September 24 – John McDonald
September 25 – Rich Hunter
September 27 – Radhames Dykhoff
September 30 – Jeremy Giambi

October
October 2 – Brian Knight
October 2 – Doug Nickle
October 3 – Alex Ramírez
October 6 – Matt Duff
October 9 – Courtney Duncan
October 10 – Luther Hackman
October 11 – Mike Duvall
October 11 – Jesús Sánchez
October 14 – Erik Sabel
October 17 – Curt Lyons
October 17 – Luis Pineda
October 17 – John Rocker
October 24 – Wilton Guerrero
October 25 – Joe Nelson
October 26 – Marty McLeary
October 27 – Denny Stark
October 28 – Braden Looper
October 29 – R. A. Dickey
October 31 – Steve Cox

November
November 1 – Ryan Glynn
November 2 – Orlando Cabrera
November 2 – José Fernández
November 4 – Carlos Mendoza
November 5 – José Santiago
November 7 – Kris Benson
November 7 – Glendon Rusch
November 9 – Jeff D'Amico
November 9 – Beiker Graterol
November 9 – José Rosado
November 10 – Micah Bowie
November 16 – Mark Corey
November 17 – Jim Mann
November 19 – John Roskos
November 19 – Mario Valdez
November 22 – Joe Nathan
November 27 – Ken Ray

December
December 4 – Tadahito Iguchi
December 5 – Ken Vining
December 7 – Mike Bell
December 12 – Julius Matos
December 14 – Billy Koch
December 18 – Lance Carter
December 18 – José Rodríguez
December 20 – Augie Ojeda
December 22 – Trevor Enders
December 23 – Pascual Matos
December 24 – Keith Luuloa
December 24 – Kevin Millwood
December 24 – Jamey Wright
December 26 – Brian Fitzgerald
December 26 – Corey Lee
December 27 – Nate Bland
December 29 – Emil Brown
December 29 – Richie Sexson

Deaths

January
January 1 – Jimmy Smith, 78, switch-hitting utility infielder who began his career with the Chicago Whales and Baltimore Terrapins of the "outlaw" Federal league, then bounced among five National League clubs: the Pittsburgh Pirates, New York Giants, Boston Braves, Cincinnati Reds (where he was a member of the 1919 World Series champions) and Philadelphia Phillies; appeared in 360 games over eight seasons (1914–1919, 1921–1922).
January 2 – Gordon Slade, 69, infielder who appeared in 437 career games for the Brooklyn Robins/Dodgers, St. Louis Cardinals and Cincinnati Reds between 1930 and 1935.
January 12 – Frank E. McKinney, 69, Indiana banker and political figure who was principal owner of the Pittsburgh Pirates from August 8, 1946 to July 18, 1950; longtime owner of his hometown team, the Triple-A Indianapolis Indians.
January 12 – Jim Middleton, 84, pitcher who worked in 51 MLB games for the 1917 New York Giants and 1921 Detroit Tigers.
January 12 – Joe Smith, 80, catcher who appeared in 14 games for the 1913 New York Yankees.
January 14 – Lloyd Brown, 69, left-handed pitcher who won 46 games for the 1930–1932 Washington Senators and also played with the Brooklyn Robins, St. Louis Browns, Boston Red Sox, Cleveland Indians and Philadelphia Phillies over 12 seasons between 1925 and 1940; later, a scout.
January 14 – Jay Partridge, 71, second baseman for the 1927–1928 Brooklyn Robins who appeared in 183 games.
January 17 – Archie Hinton, 47, pitcher, third baseman and shortstop who played 25 games for the Baltimore Elite Giants of the Negro National League in 1944 and 1945.
January 18 – Pete Appleton, 69, relief pitcher for seven teams over 14 seasons between 1927 and 1945, who won 14 games for the 1936 Washington Senators; longtime scout for the Washington/Minnesota Twins franchise; known by his birth name, Jablonowski, until 1934, when he legally changed it.
January 18 – Thomas Healy, 78, third baseman who appeared in 29 total games for the hapless 1915–1916 Philadelphia Athletics.
January 20 – Homer Hillebrand, 94, first baseman and left-handed pitcher for the Pittsburgh Pirates (1905–1906, 1908); Princeton grad compiled a won–lost mark of 8–4 and a 2.51 ERA in 18 games and 114 innings pitched and batted .237 in 131 at bats at the plate over 47 total MLB games.
January 20 – George Hockette, 72, pitcher for the Boston Red Sox in the mid-1930s.
January 21 – Claude Cooper, 81, outfielder who appeared in 373 career games for the 1913 New York Giants, 1914–1915 Brooklyn Tip-Tops of the "outlaw" Federal League, and 1916–1917 Philadelphia Phillies.
January 23 – Spoon Carter, 71, two-time Negro American League All-Star pitcher (1947 and 1948) and member of 1943–1944 Negro World Series champion Homestead Grays.
January 28 – Paul Fittery, 86, left-handed pitcher who took the mound in 25 games for the 1914 Cincinnati Reds and 1917 Philadelphia Phillies; also appeared in five games as an outfielder or pinch hitter.

February
February 1 – Claude Berry, 93, catcher who played sparingly for the 1904 Chicago White Sox and 1906–1907 Philadelphia Athletics, then, a decade later, appeared in 224 contests for the 1914–1915 Pittsburgh Rebels of the Federal League.
February 4 – Hank Winston, 69, relief pitcher who worked in 15 career MLB games for 1933 Philadelphia Athletics and 1936 Brooklyn Dodgers.
February 6 – Benny Meyer, 89, outfielder in 39 games for Brooklyn and Philadelphia of the National League (1913, 1925) and 271 games with Baltimore and Buffalo of the Federal League (1914–1915); MLB coach and longtime scout.
February 13 – Scrip Lee, 75, Negro league baseball pitcher from 1921 to 1934.
February 16 – Gus Brittain, 64, catcher and pinch hitter who appeared in three games for the 1937 Cincinnati Reds.
February 16 – Bill Stellbauer, 79, outfielder who played in 25 games for the 1916 Philadelphia Athletics.
February 19 – Frank Miller, 87, pitcher who appeared in 163 games over seven seasons spanning 1913 to 1923 for three clubs, primarily the Pittsburgh Pirates and Boston Braves.
February 20 – Bob Christian, 28, outfielder who appeared in 54 career games for the Detroit Tigers (1968) and Chicago White Sox (1969–1970); also played for Japan's Toei Flyers (1971–1972).

March
March 1 – Larry Doyle, 87, second baseman, primarily for the New York Giants whom he captained, who batted .300 five times and won the NL's 1912 MVP award; led NL in hits twice and stole home 17 times.
March 4 – Les Sweetland, 74, left-handed hurler for the 1927–1930 Philadelphia Phillies and 1931 Chicago Cubs who appeared in 161 career contests.
March 9 – Hal Quick, 56, shortstop/pinch hitter in 12 games for the 1939 Washington Senators.
March 12 – Medric Boucher, 88, catcher who played in 17 total games for Baltimore and Pittsburgh of the Federal League in 1914.
March 14 – Alex Pompez, 83, owner of the Negro Leagues' Cuban Stars and New York Cubans between 1916 and 1950, who later became a scouting supervisor for the New York Giants.
March 19 – Julius "June" Greene, 74, pinch-hitter and pitcher in 32 games for 1928–1929 Philadelphia Phillies; went 7-for-25 with five walks as a batter, and 0–0 (18.38 ERA) in 15 innings pitched over six mound appearances.
March 16 – Joe Kohlman, 61, pitcher who appeared in nine career games for the 1937–1938 Washington Senators.
March 16 – Felton Snow, 68, All-Star third baseman and manager whose Negro leagues career extended from 1931 to 1947, notably as a member of the Baltimore Elite Giants.
March 26 – Art Kores, 87, third baseman who played 60 games for the 1914 St. Louis Terriers of the Federal League.
March 30 – Goose Curry, 68, outfielder, pitcher and manager whose career in Negro leagues spanned 1928 to 1948.
March 31 – Bunny Hearn, 70, left-handed pitcher who worked in 59 games for the Boston Braves from 1926 through 1929.

April
April 5 – Fred Snodgrass, 86, center fielder for the New York Giants (1908–1915) who made a critical drop of an easy fly ball—"Snodgrass's Muff"—in the tenth inning of the deciding game in the 1912 World Series, which was won by the Boston Red Sox.
April 6 – Roy Wood, 81, outfielder/first baseman who played from 1913–1915 for the Pittsburgh Pirates and Cleveland Naps/Indians.
April 11 – Bob Baird, 34, southpaw pitcher who posted an 0–4 record (7.25 ERA) in eight total games for the 1962–1963 Washington Senators.
April 15 – Buddy Armour, 58, outfielder/shortstop who played in the Negro leagues from 1933 to 1947; member of 1945 Negro World Series champion Cleveland Buckeyes.
April 20 – Al Eckert, 67, left-handed pitcher who went 0–2 in 18 career appearances for the 1930–1931 Cincinnati Reds and 1935 St. Louis Cardinals.
April 20 – Elmer Ponder, 80, pitcher for the Pittsburgh Pirates (1917, 1919–1921) and Chicago Cubs (1921) who worked in 69 career games.
April 22 – Chance Cummings, 81, first baseman for the Atlantic City Bacharach Giants and New York Lincoln Giants of the Eastern Colored League between 1923 and 1928.
April 22 – Steve Swetonic, 70, pitcher for the Pittsburgh Pirates in the early 1930s, who tied for the National League lead in shutouts in the 1932 season.
April 23 – Cy Williams, 86, center fielder for the Chicago Cubs (1912–1917) and Philadelphia Phillies (1918–1930) who became the first National League player to hit 200 home runs, leading the league four times.

May
May 1 – Hal Anderson, 70, outfielder who played in nine games for 1932 Chicago White Sox and had a long career as minor league player and manager.
May 5 – Tom McNamara, 78, pinch-hitter for the 1922 Pittsburgh Pirates.
May 5 – Vito Tamulis, 62, left-handed pitcher who posted a 40–28 record with a 3.97 ERA in six seasons between 1934 and 1941 for the New York Yankees, St. Louis Browns, Brooklyn Dodgers and Philadelphia Phillies.
May 13  – Vet Barnes, 62, pitcher who won 14 of 19 decisions (2.94 ERA) for the 1937–1938 Kansas City Monarchs of the Negro American League.
May 15 – Lou North, 82, pitcher for Detroit Tigers (1913), St. Louis Cardinals (1917 and 1920–1924) and Boston Braves (1924); essentially a reliever, he appeared in 191 career games and led National League in saves (not then an official statistic) in both 1921 and 1922.
May 18 – Dan Topping, 61, co-owner (1945 to 1964) and president (from October 1947 to 1964) of the New York Yankees, during which time the team won ten World Series and fifteen AL pennants.
May 22 – Ernie White, 57, left-handed pitcher for St. Louis Cardinals (1940–1943) and Boston Braves (1946–1948) who posted a 17–7 mark (with an ERA of 2.40) for the 1941 Redbirds; later a minor-league manager and MLB coach.
May 23 – Rolla Daringer, 85, Cardinals' shortstop who played 12 total games during two short trials (1914 and 1915).
May 24 – Cliff Markle, 80, pitched in 56 games for the New York Yankees and Cincinnati Reds over five seasons spanning 1915 to 1924.

June
June 9 – Pat Caraway, 68, southpaw hurler who appeared in 108 career games for 1930–1932 Chicago White Sox; led American League in games lost (24) in 1931.
June 21 – Homer Blankenship, 71, pitcher in 13 games for the 1922–1923 Chicago White Sox and 1928 Pittsburgh Pirates.
June 21 – Joe Jenkins, 83, reserve catcher/pinch hitter in 40 total MLB games, notably with 1917 and 1919 White Sox; did not appear in 1917 World Series, a Chicago triumph, or the infamous 1919 Fall Classic.
June 23 – Al Boucher, 92, shortstop who played 147 games for the 1914 St. Louis Terriers of the Federal League.
June 24 – Joe Burns, 58, third baseman/outfielder who played in 111 career games for the wartime Boston Braves (1943) and Philadelphia Athletics (1944–1945).
June 30 – Mule Haas, 70, center fielder for the Pittsburgh Pirates (1925), Philadelphia Athletics (1928–1932 and 1938) and Chicago White Sox (1933–1937), who hit two home runs in the 1929 World Series; member of 1929 and 1930 world champion Athletics.
June 30 – Red Jones, 62, outfielder/pinch hitter who was granted a 12-game trial with the St. Louis Cardinals during April and May 1940.
June 30 – Bill Perrin, 64, left-hander who started one game on the mound for the Cleveland Indians on September 30, 1934.

July
July 2 – Paul Strand, 80, pitcher/outfielder who appeared in 96 games (29 on the mound) for the 1913–1915 Boston Braves and 1924 Philadelphia Athletics; went 6–2 with a 2.44 ERA for 1914 "Miracle Braves."
July 4 – Del Webb, 75, co-owner and chairman of the Yankees from 1945 to 1964; co-owner Dan Topping had died just weeks earlier.
July 5 – Duster Mails, 79, left-handed pitcher who won 32 games for three MLB teams, principally the Cleveland Indians, between 1915 and 1926, but 226 contests in a 602-game, 18-year minor league career.
July 9 – Leo Mangum, 78, pitcher who worked in 85 games for three teams, principally the Boston Braves, over seven seasons between 1924 and 1935.
July 15 – Claud Derrick, 88, infielder in 113 games over all or part of five seasons (1910–1914) for the Philadelphia Athletics, New York Yankees, Cincinnati Reds and Chicago Cubs.
July 17 – Dizzy Dean, 64, Hall of Fame pitcher who won MVP award in 1934 for the world-champion "Gas House Gang" St. Louis Cardinals with 30–7 campaign, the last 30-win season by an NL pitcher; was MVP runnerup the next two years, but a broken toe suffered in 1937 All-Star game led to a career-ending arm injury; he became a broadcaster for St. Louis Browns and national telecasts of the Game of the Week known for folksy mangling of the English language.
July 23 – Walter Signer, 63, pitcher in ten games for World War II-era Chicago Cubs (1943, 1945).
July 26 – George Barr, 82, National League umpire from 1931 to 1949 who worked four World Series and two All-Star games.
July 26 – Vernon Stouffer, 72, Cleveland food industry and restaurant magnate who was principal owner of the Indians from 1966 to 1972.

August
August 8 – Howie Pollet, 53, left-handed pitcher and three-time National League All-Star who twice won 20 games (1946 and 1949) for the St. Louis Cardinals and twice led NL in earned run average (1943 and 1946); won 131 career games for four MLB clubs over 14-year career, and served as pitching coach of 1959–1964 Cardinals and 1965 Houston Astros; three-time World Series champion as player and coach.
August 13 – Alto Lane, 66, pitcher who took the mound for the Memphis Red Sox, Indianapolis ABCs, Kansas City Monarchs and Cincinnati Tigers of the Negro leagues between 1929 and 1934.
August 14 – Lefty Robinson, 83, pitcher for the St. Louis Stars, Birmingham Black Barons and Atlanta Black Crackers of the Negro leagues between 1923 and 1932.
August 17 – Johnny Barrett, 58, outfielder in 588 career games for Pittsburgh Pirates and Boston Braves from 1942 to 1946; led NL in triples (19) and stolen bases (28) in 1944.
August 19 – Augie Bergamo, 57, reserve outfielder for wartime 1943–1944 St. Louis Cardinals; appeared in 174 MLB games and a member of 1944 World Series champions.

September
September 6 – Sammy Hale, 77, third baseman who played 883 career games for 1920–1921 Detroit Tigers, 1923–1929 Philadelphia Athletics and 1930 St. Louis Browns; batted .302 lifetime.
September 8 – Bert Niehoff, 90, second baseman for four National League clubs from 1913 to 1918, and one of the first managers selected by the All-American Girls Professional Baseball League.
September 16 – Frank Walker, 79, outfielder who appeared in 139 games over five seasons for the Detroit Tigers, Philadelphia Athletics and New York Giants between 1917 and 1925.
September 19 – James "Zack" Taylor, 76, NL catcher for 15 seasons, later a coach, manager and scout for 35 years; best known as pilot of the St. Louis Browns (part of 1946 and 1948 through 1951) who was at the helm for Bill Veeck's celebrated Eddie Gaedel and "Grandstand Managers Night" stunts during the 1951 campaign.
September 24 – Dick Porter, 72, outfielder in 675 games for Cleveland Indians (1929–1934) and Boston Red Sox (1934), batting .308 lifetime with 774 hits; longtime minor-league manager.
September 25 – Cliff Brady, 77, a second baseman for the Boston Red Sox and minor league manager, who also was a member of the Scullin Steel soccer team which won the National Challenge Cup in 1922.
September 26 – Lefty Stewart, 74, pitcher who won 20 games for the 1930 St. Louis Browns; also hurled for the Detroit Tigers, Washington Senators and Cleveland Indians, and went 101–98 (4.19) over his ten-year career.
September 28 – Willie Hogan, 90, outfielder who appeared in 238 career games as a member of the Philadelphia Athletics (1911) and St. Louis Browns (1911–1912).
September 29 – Van Patrick, 58, sportscaster noted for football and boxing coverage, whose baseball work included play-by-play assignments for the Cleveland Indians (1948) and Detroit Tigers (1949 and 1952–1959)
September 29 – By Speece, 77, pitcher in 62 career games for the Washington Senators (1924), Cleveland Indians (1925–1926) and Philadelphia Phillies (1930); member of 1924 World Series champion Senators.

October
October 5 – Ed Grimes, 69, infielder who got into 74 career games for the St. Louis Browns in 1931 and 1932.
October 13 – Sam Rice, 84, Hall of Fame right fielder for 1915–1933 Washington Senators and 1934 Cleveland Indians; batted .322 lifetime and led AL in steals and triples once each; remembered for disputed catch in 1925 World Series; finished career with 2,987 hits, at a time when little attention was paid to career totals.
October 20 – Leonardo Chapman, 52, first- and third-baseman for 1944 Baltimore Elite Giants of the Negro National League.
October 22 – Pat Pieper, 88, the Chicago Cubs field (public address) announcer from 1916 to 1974, a span of 59 years. 
October 28 – George "Teddy" Wilson, 50, pinch hitter and outfielder in 145 games for three clubs, principally the New York Giants, over all or parts of three seasons (1952, 1953 and 1956).
October 29 – Charlie Mason, 79, outfielder/first baseman for numerous Negro leagues clubs, including the New York Lincoln Giants, Atlantic City Bacharach Giants and Homestead Grays, between 1922 and 1932.
October 30 – Jimmy Shevlin, 65, first baseman who played 53 total games for 1930 Detroit Tigers and 1932 and 1934 Cincinnati Reds.
October 31 – Buddy Myer, 70, second baseman for the Washington Senators (1925–1927 and 1929–1941) and Boston Red Sox (1927–1928) who batted .303 lifetime with 2,131 hits; won 1935 American League batting title (.349) and led league in stolen bases (30) in 1928; two-time AL All-Star.

November
November 1 – Bullet Joe Bush, 81, pitcher who won 195 games between 1912 and 1928, including a no-hitter; won 26 contests for the 1922 New York Yankees; three-time World Series champion (1913 Philadelphia Athletics, 1918 Boston Red Sox, and 1923 Yankees).
November 1 – Red Hadley, 65, outfielder who appeared in 27 games for Atlanta and Indianapolis of the Negro American League in 1938 and 1939.
November 4 – Harry Fritz, 84, third baseman who, after a brief stint with the 1913 Philadelphia Athletics, jumped to Chicago of the Federal League, playing in 144 games during the 1914 and 1915 seasons.
November 4 – Charley Justice, 61, outfielder who played for the Akron Grays and Detroit Stars of the Negro leagues during the 1930s.
November 10 – Mel Simons, 74, outfielder who appeared in 75 games for 1931–1932 Chicago White Sox.
November 10 – Ben Paschal, 79, valuable reserve outfielder from 1924 to 1929 for the New York Yankees; member of 1927 and 1928 world champions.
November 21 – Leon Pettit, 72, left-handed pitcher who worked in 44 MLB games for the 1935 Washington Senators and 1937 Philadelphia Phillies.
November 23 – Jerry Benjamin, 65, standout centerfielder between 1932 and 1948 who three times led the Negro National League in stolen bases and was a three-time All-Star; as a member of the Homestead Grays, he played on eight NNL pennant-winners and two Negro World Series champions (1943, 1944).
November 23 – Babe Twombly, 78, outfielder for the 1920–1921 Chicago Cubs; batted .304 lifetime with 109 hits in 165 big-league games. 
November 24 – Johnny Weekly, 37, outfielder who played in 53 games for the Houston Colt .45s from 1962 to 1964.
November 25 – Herb "Duke" Brett, 74, pitcher who worked in 11 games for 1924–1925 Chicago Cubs; longtime manager in Piedmont and Carolina leagues.
November 25 – Frank Wilson, 73, outfielder who appeared in 168 games between 1924 and 1928 for three MLB teams, principally the Boston Braves.
November 25 – Eddie Dent, 86, starting pitcher for the Brooklyn Superbas from 1909–1912.
November 29 – Al Moore, 72, centerfielder who appeared in 30 games over parts of two seasons with the 1925–1926 New York Giants.

December
December 4 – Dick Luebke, 39, left-handed pitcher who appeared in ten games for the 1962 Baltimore Orioles.
December 5 – Jim Beckman, 69, pitcher and Cincinnati native who worked in ten games for his hometown Reds in 1927–1928.
December 7 – Red Dorman, 74, outfielder who batted .364 in 25 games and 89 plate appearances for the Cleveland Indians in August and September 1928, his only year in the big leagues.
December 11 – Gordon Maltzberger, 62, relief pitcher who put up a 20–13 (2.70) record with 33 saves in 135 games for the Chicago White Sox (1943–1944 and 1946–1947); later, a pitching coach.
December 12 – Booker McDaniel, 61, All-Star pitcher for the 1941–1945 Kansas City Monarchs; led 1945 Negro American League in victories, strikeouts, games pitched, games started, complete games, shutouts and saves—among other categories. 
December 18 – Harry Hooper, 87, Hall of Fame right fielder for the Boston Red Sox and Chicago White Sox, who was an outstanding defensive player and solid leadoff hitter, helping the Red Sox to four champion titles, while retiring with the fifth-most walks in history.
December 22 – Allyn Stout, 70, pitcher who appeared in 180 games (151 in relief) for the St. Louis Cardinals (1931–1933), Cincinnati Reds (1933–1934), New York Giants (1935) and Boston Braves (1943).
December 25 – Felton Stratton, 79, infielder/outfielder who played for teams in the Eastern Colored League and Negro National League between 1923 and 1933.
December 28 – Jack Salveson, 60, pitcher in 87 games for four MLB clubs, principally the Cleveland Indians, in five seasons spanning 1933 to 1945; as a 19-year-old rookie, pitched sparingly for 1933 World Series champion New York Giants.
December 30 – Al Shaw, 93, outfielder for the 1907–1909 St. Louis Cardinals; five years later, joined the upstart Federal League, batting .301 in 244 games for Brooklyn (1914) and Kansas City (1915).

References

External links